Murray Foreland is a high ice-covered Antarctic peninsula,  long and  wide, forming the northwestern arm of the Martin Peninsula on the coast of Marie Byrd Land. First mapped from aerial photographs taken by U.S. Navy Operation Highjump in January 1947. Named by Advisory Committee on Antarctic Names (US-ACAN) for Grover E. Murray, American geologist, member of the Board of Directors, National Science Foundation (1964-), president of Texas Tech University, Lubbock, Texas (1966–76).

See also
Hadley Point

Peninsulas of Marie Byrd Land